The College of Information Studies (Maryland's iSchool) is a school within the University of Maryland, College Park in Maryland, United States. The College offers graduate study leading to the Master of Library and Information Science (MLIS), the Master of Information Management (MIM), the Master of Science in Human Computer Interaction (HCIM), and the Doctor of Philosophy (Ph.D.) in Information Studies. In addition, it offers an undergraduate degree, the Bachelor of Science in Information Science. The College of Information Studies focuses on creating new designs and addressing issues involving Information Management.

History
The iSchool was founded in 1965 with Paul Wasserman as its first dean.  Wasserman, a former military man who was part of the Invasion of Normandy, held the post for 5 years.  Wasserman was very supportive of research and the school became the first Information school to require a technology course.  Wasserman saw technology as a tool for information management.  Wasserman was a librarian, and his broad vision helped the program get on its feet.  He was constantly traveling and recruiting international faculty members and students.  Wasserman would later write an autobiography which is available at McKeldin Library.  The school's original name was the School of Library and Information Services and by 1972 it had established its location in Hornbake Library's South Wing.  The school attained full accreditation from the American Library Association (it has never lost its accreditation) in 1966 and the first PhD students were in 1967.

In 1991 the school had a major crisis as it was very close to being shut down.

In 1993 Ann Prentice became dean of the school.  During this time period the University of Maryland's Provost prompted a general review of the school and a reexamination of the goals and mission statement.  The Provost wanted to promote more innovation, creation, research and services.  Therefore, the school went through significant changes as the MLS curriculum was revised and the school started to morph into what it is now, an iSchool.  Bruce Dearstyne took over as Interim Dean in 2001, after Prentice retired, and the transformation continued under his leadership.  His signature initiative was introduction of the Master of Information Management program (MIM).  In 2005, Jenny Preece became Dean.  Under Preece, the MIM program has grown substantially.  In the 2007 school year the MIM program had its highest student body count at 149.  In addition, under Preece's directorship, a new master's program was added, Master of Science in Human-Computer Interaction.

In the summer of 2015, Brian Butler took over as interim dean as Jenny Preece stepped down. Keith Marzullo is the new incoming dean from the summer of 2016.

List of deans
Paul Wasserman:  1965-1970
Michael Reynolds (interim): 1970
James Liesener (interim): 1970-1971
Margaret Chisholm: 1971-1975
Henry Duebster (interim)
Keith Wright: 1977-1980
Michael Reynolds (interim)
Anne MacLeod (interim)
Claude Walston: 1983-1992
Ann Prentice:  1993-2001
Bruce Dearstyne (interim):  2001-2005
Charles Lowry (interim): 2005
Jenny Preece:  2005–2015
Brian Butler (interim): 2015-2016
Keith Marzullo: 2016-onwards

Challenges
The iSchool has faced several challenges throughout its history.

Crisis of 1991
In the 1980s there was heated debate over whether Library Schools should be a part of major research-oriented universities.  The University of Chicago's Graduate Library School was closed in 1989 and its closing was attributed to "the divorce of the School's research activities from what the profession perceived as its needs for training."  Shortly thereafter, in 1990, Columbia University's School of Library Service was closed.  There were reports of fierce opposition from tenured faculty to sever ties to all library communities and reorient priorities to support newly emerging information communities as well as deemphasize professionally relevant education and practitioner connections.  In 1991, coupled with the economic downturn (the University had implemented furloughs as well) there was a call for the iSchool at Maryland to be shut down.  It was proposed that the school became a department rather than a self-standing college.  There was a public, open meeting where the issue was debated.  The school was given support by Representative Steny Hoyer.  In addition, past deans, faculty and alumni were on hand to counter the proposal.  Former students spoke up in defense of the program, attributing their successes in public service jobs to the college's educational programs.  The school was able to avoid being shut down.

Transition phase
In the late 1990s and early 2000s (decade), there was a period of transition within the iSchool.  There was a general realization that the field was changing and that the business model was changing.  With the advent of the Web and search engines there were changes in how information was being gathered and consumed.  There would be more of a demand for "Information Technology Professionals" rather than Librarians.  During this time, there was a lot of funding going to the Human Computer Interaction Lab at the University and with the perceived growth of technology the lab was moved into the South wing of Hornbake Library where the iSchool was located.  This move caused some tension as the iSchool's teaching library was disbanded and in its place faculty offices and research facilities were set up to accommodate the growth of the school.  There was a fight to keep the iSchool's library - there were protests and petitions but none were fruitful and the library was removed from Hornbake.  There was a recognized opportunity to train professionals for the corporate world and so when Dearstyne took over he helped lead the school as it introduced the new MIM program.  Some faculty felt like the school was abandoning its "ontology" and abandoning libraries as an institution.  There wasn't necessarily resistance to the MIM but rather to a second master's program in general.  The question, "not will it be" but "what will it be" defined the debates.  Despite initial concerns, the school has seen a steady rise in acceptance and interest.  2007 was a record year for the MIM program in number of students (149).  In 2009 U.S. News & World Report recognized Maryland’s iSchool as one of the top information schools in the country, ranking it 10th among all public universities

Community
As part of a major research university the iSchool has initiated and led many programs both internally and externally that have helped serve the community.

Inside the iSchool

Human-Computer Interaction Lab (HCIL)
The Human-Computer Interaction Lab is supported by the iSchool and UMIACS. Founded in 1983 by Ben Shneiderman, it is one of the oldest HCI labs in the country.

Information Policy and Access Center (iPAC)
"The Information Policy and Research Center (iPAC) is a research and education facility that explores social, policy, and technology aspects of information access and use across cultural institutions, government agencies, and other information-based organizations; communities; and populations. Researchers at iPAC study what policies and/or technologies lead to equitable and inclusive information access, a digitally literate population, and an informed and engaged public."

Privacy Education & Research Lab (PEARL) 
Dr. Jessica Vitak leads PEARL, studying and curating ways for people to manage and understanding their privacy and security in networked contexts, including social media and other online communities. Research areas include big data ethics, the privacy risks associated with internet of things technology, children's understanding of privacy and security concepts, and surveillance.

Ethics and Values in Design Lab (EViD) 
The EViD lab, led by Dr. Katie Shilton, focuses on the way that ethics and policy affect the design and use of technology.

Notable faculty and accomplishments
Dr. Diane Barlow helped develop a proposal in 1993 that awarded tuition to women who were part-time students.  6-8 students were chosen and their tuition remitted so they could complete the program.  The initiative was part of the school's goal to help provide monetary relief to students during bad economic times.
Dr. Barlow and Dr. Prentice helped initiate a collaboration and exchange program with a Chinese Institution in Beijing.
Dr. Barlow helped expand the school's reach to Shady Grove and now the school has extended its educational reach.
During Prentice's deanship there was an increased demand for Library Media Specialists in the state of Maryland.  Prince George's County, Howard County and Montgomery County entered into an agreement with the school where tuition was taken care of for a certain number of students who entered the program.  In exchange these students committed to working for the county for a period of time.

Outside the iSchool

Research support
There has been research support for the iSchool from National Science Foundation, Google, IBM, Microsoft, the Library of Congress and the Institute of Museum and Library Services.

Kidsteam
Children, ages 7–11, work with HCIL faculty/staff/students after school and over the summer to create new technologies for children.

Curriculum

Bachelor of Science in Information Science 
Started in 2016, the undergraduate program in Information Science is one of the most recent additions to the undergraduate majors offered at the University of Maryland in College Park. Its goal is to educate students in an interdisciplinary curriculum with aspects from computer science, business, and psychology. In the iSchool, this bachelors program is meant to focus on how "information, people, and technology " come together within the field of Information Science. Undergraduate students focused on this major will learn skills related to online website development essential to the work force. These skills include database design, web and mobile development, and data analytics. These students will also prepare for leadership and management roles while taking humanities classes and engaging in internships.

MLIS
The Master of Library & Information Science Program educates students in the knowledge, skills, habits of thought and inquiry, and ethics of the library and information professions to enable them to be leaders in the state, national, and global information society.
The program for the MLIS degree requires 36 credit hours of academic work to be completed with a minimum average of B within five calendar years from the first registration. In the non -thesis option, all credits are coursework. The thesis option requires 30 credits of coursework and six credits of thesis research. The usual and recommended course of study for a full-time student is approximately 18–24 months. As of 2018, the program offered seven specializations: Archives and Digital Curation, Diversity and Inclusion, Intelligence and Analytics, Legal Informatics, School Library, Youth Experience, and the Individualized Program Plan. In addition, there was a Certificate in Museum Scholarship and Material Culture, and a joint program offering the MLIS alongside a master's degree in history.

MIM
The MIM program trains information technology professionals who know how to strategically manage information and technology and who understand the issues of information management, business management, computer science, and information systems.  The MIM degree requires 36 credit hours of academic work to be completed with a minimum average of B within five calendar years from the first registration. A unique component of the MIM program is the pair of project courses taken at the end of the coursework. One of the courses involves a team project focused on solving an actual information management project at a real-world organization, and the other is an individual project. Each of these courses carry three credits, and require about 120 hours of work per student over a regular semester of three months. As of 2018, the program offered six specializations: Data Analytics, Strategic Management, User Experience, Technology Development, Individualized Program Plan, and Information Management Research.

HCIM
The Master of Science in Human-Computer Interaction degree integrates information studies, computer science, education, psychology and engineering to prepare HCI leaders of the future.  Through coursework and research experiences, students in this program will develop skills in:
Fundamentals of Human-Computer Interaction
Advanced research methods
Usability analysis and testing
Social computing strategies and technologies
Technology design

Doctoral program
Students must complete a minimum of 25 graduate credit hours while matriculated at the University of Maryland (or 28 hours if basic statistics is taken as a graduate course). Course-work will be taken in three areas of study which include: Information Studies (6 credit hours); Research Methods and Design (10 credit hours) and specialized area(s) (9 credit hours).
All students have a First Year Review the first full academic year that a student takes his/her first doctoral seminar. Students prepare a portfolio that self-evaluates progress. This may include papers written for coursework or research, a presentation on a research topic and/or reviews by previous course instructors. A committee of at least three faculty members, a majority of whom must be members of the iSchool faculty, will review the work and inform the student in writing of the results.

Students do not take comprehensive exams, but instead write an Integrative Paper that synthesizes and applies knowledge from broad areas of the information field. A committee of at least three faculty members, a majority of whom must be members of the iSchool faculty, approves the topic and abstract of the paper, and certifies its successful completion. The paper will typically be written after completion of coursework or equivalent experience (e.g., extensive work in a research environment) and must be completed and approved before advancement to candidacy.

Students are required to successfully defend a dissertation to complete the program.

References

External links
 College of Information Studies
 Human Computer Interaction Lab
 The Center for the Advanced Study of Communities and Information (CASCI)
 The Information Policy and Access Center (iPAC)
 Maryland Institute for Technology in the Humanities (MITH)
 The Digital Curation Innovation Center (DCIC)
 Privacy Education & Research Lab (PEARL)
 Ethics and Values in Design Lab (EViD)
 College of Library and Information Cervices records at the University of Maryland Libraries

College of Information Studies
Information schools
Information Studies
Educational institutions established in 1965
American Library Association accredited library schools
1965 establishments in Maryland